The Foundling is a 1940 comedy drama directed by Tatyana Lukashevich. The film was a production of  Mosfilm  based on the script by Rina Zelyonaya and Agniya Barto and was released on 27 January 1940. It was one of the first Russian family films. Originally in black and white, it was reproduced in colour in 2010.

Plot
Little Natasha went out and got lost in a big city. Her fate was attended by all whom she met in her fascinating, full of cheerful adventure travel. Everything, of course, ended well. And while Natasha was wandering around town, she made a lot of friends, among both adults and children.

Cast 
 Veronika Lebedeva as Natasha
 Faina Ranevskaya as Lyalya
 Pyotr Repnin as Mulya, Lyalya's husband  
 Rostislav Plyatt as bachelor
 Rina Zelyonaya as Arisha, housekeeper
 Olga Zhiznyeva as Nelia Valeryanovna, Natasha's and Yura's mother  
 Victor Gromov as Nina's father
 Tatyana Barysheva as dentist
 Elya Bykovskaya as Nina, Yura's schoolmate (uncredited)
 Dima Glukhov as Yura, Natasha's brother (uncredited)
 Vitya Boyko as Alyosha, Yura's schoolmate (uncredited)
 Andrey Starostin as cameo, football player (uncredited)
 Stanislaus Leyta as cameo, football player (uncredited)
 Nikolay Arsky as militia chief (uncredited)
 Ivan Lobyzovsky as Sergeev, member of the search group (uncredited)
 Lev Anninsky as  boy from the kindergarten (uncredited)
 Anatoli Papanov as passer (uncredited)
 Fyodor Odinokov as passer (uncredited)
 Oleg Basilashvili as boy on the bike (uncredited)

History
During the years of the Great Patriotic War, the film's negative was destroyed during the bombing, but a preserved positive copy was found in the USSR State Film Fund.

References

External links
 
  Из истории советского лета

Mosfilm films
1940s Russian-language films
1940 comedy-drama films
Soviet comedy-drama films
Russian comedy-drama films
Russian children's films
Soviet black-and-white films
Films set in Moscow
Films set in the Soviet Union
Films shot in Moscow
1940 films
Russian black-and-white films
Children's comedy-drama films
Soviet children's films